Thomas Allan Muirhead (24 January 1897 – 27 May 1979) was a Scottish footballer who played for Hibernian, Rangers and Scotland.

Playing career

Hibernian and Rangers
Muirhead, a forward who was occasionally deployed as a half-back, was signed by Rangers for £20 from Hibernian in May 1917. He made his debut against his former club in a 3–0 win at Ibrox on 15 September 1917, although he did not become a regular until the following season.

American Soccer League
Muirhead's Rangers career was interrupted by a brief stint in the US in 1925. Cash-rich American Soccer League club Boston Wonder Workers lured him across the Atlantic to assume the role of player-manager. However, despite the presence of several other Scots, including internationalists such as Alex McNab and Barney Battles, he could not settle in Boston and returned to Glasgow after only 14 games.

Return to Scotland
Muirhead returned to Rangers where he played until 1930. He scored 46 goals in 349 overall appearances for Rangers and won eight Scottish Football League championship medals (he never won the Scottish Cup, playing in the lost finals of 1921 and 1929, but not in the long-awaited win of 1930). He was also captain of the club for a spell.

International
Muirhead was capped at international level, making eight appearances for Scotland. He captained Scotland in a 1–0 defeat against Ireland on 25 February 1928.

Managerial career
After his playing career, Muirhead had further spells in management with St Johnstone (1931–36) and Preston North End (1936–37) and he also worked as a sports journalist.

See also
List of Scotland national football team captains

References

1897 births
1979 deaths
Scottish footballers
Scotland international footballers
Hearts of Beath F.C. players
Hibernian F.C. players
Rangers F.C. players
American Soccer League (1921–1933) players
Boston Soccer Club players
American Soccer League (1921–1933) coaches
Scottish football managers
St Johnstone F.C. managers
Preston North End F.C. managers
King's Own Scottish Borderers officers
British Army personnel of World War I
People from Cowdenbeath
Footballers from Fife
Scottish Football League players
Scottish Junior Football Association players
Scottish Football League representative players
Scottish Football League managers
Association football forwards
Association football wing halves
Association football player-managers
Scottish expatriate sportspeople in the United States
Expatriate soccer players in the United States
Scottish expatriate footballers
Scottish sportswriters